The Life Entity is a fictional creature, a physical embodiment of all life within the DC Universe. Long ago starting all life from the planet Earth, it went on to create the seven entities of the Emotional Electromagnetic Spectrum, and was hidden in a dimensional tear within the Earth by the Guardians of the Universe when they discovered its existence, in order to preserve it from exploitation and possible harm.

History
The Life Entity formed as the embodiment of life at the beginning of the universe. While at first it was not known whether the Entity was brought into the universe by accident or by design, it was recently established that apparently the Life Entity was formed when the celestial being named Perpetua used the Life Force to create the multiverse. After driving away the forces of the Black, the Entity was weakened as it was divided into the seven colors that led to the development of the Emotional Spectrum and other numerous organisms. This saw the birth of Ion (the Green Entity of willpower), Parallax (the yellow entity of fear), the Predator (the violet Entity of love), Ophidian (the orange Entity of avarice), the Butcher (the red Entity of rage), Adara (the blue Entity of hope), and Proselyte (the indigo Entity of compassion). In order to regain its strength it sealed itself beneath the magma of the world where its entry into the universe and began to affect the cosmos around it. It retained a link to all life and any harm to it would fall upon the living. This contradicts the Guardians of the Universe, who claimed that sentient life began on Oa, and indirectly, their original homeworld of Maltus.

In their early history, the Guardians of the Universe were beginning to harness the green light of willpower and discovered the Entity. In order to protect it from being harmed, the Oans decided to protect it by lying that all life began on Oa and hid the existence of the Entity as well as the importance of the planet Earth. As well as justifying their authority, it diverted attention from the earth to Maltus and Oa, thus making any speculation towards the origin of life was directed at the Guardians themselves, and all dangers associated with it as well. This went as far as preventing humans from joining the Green Lantern Corps.

Blackest Night
The Entity remained concealed for billions of years, until the Blackest Night. Nekron had risen in order to purge existence of all life. To aid him in his task, he resurrected the dead and formed the Black Lantern Corps. Nekron later manifested on Earth's Coast City once enough emotional energy was gathered whereupon the Black Lantern Central Power Battery was brought onto Earth. As the battle continued, Nekron had the captured ranks of the Guardians of the Universe before him. After taunting the captive Oans and asking them why they protected life when they denied themselves the joy of life one of the weak Guardians simply said "Long live the Corps" whereupon the Nekron gutted him. As he died, Black Hand ensured that the Oan passed on and took his internal organs which were filled with energy. Placing the organs on the dead earth, the power of the dead Guardian created a connection to the place where the Entity was held.

Shortly afterwards, the Entity's sleeping form manifested and Nekron used his scythe to stab it. This led to all life in the universe feeling a collective pain from the Entity's wound. It was then that Ganthet revealed the truth of the Entity's existence as Nekron continued his assault against it. The Flash noted that the Entity was not fighting back and Hal Jordan concluded that the Entity was an Embodiment of Emotion similar to Parallax or Ion in that it needed a host to empower it. Before he could take the Entity as a host, Sinestro stopped him as he claimed that it was his purpose to accomplish and plunged into the form of The Entity whereupon he emerged as a White Lantern. A voice then claimed that Thaal Sinestro's destiny awaited. After bonding with the Life Entity and becoming the Embodiment of the White Light, Sinestro experienced the memories of the ancient being whilst he used his new powers to sever the connection of the Black Lanterns to their Black Power Rings. Shortly afterwards, a seemingly fatal strike from Nekron struck Sinestro as he was bonded to the Life Entity which saw their connection being severed. The Entity reformed Sinestro's body before Nekron forced the Entity out of him. Sinestro intended to continue his assault against Nekron, but before he could do so, Hal Jordan claimed the Entity for himself, and dispersed its power over a number of Earth's super heroes, thus forming the White Lantern Corps. With their new powers, they brought Black Hand back to life, thus severing Nekron's link to the mortal world. They also brought back several other Black Lanterns to protect the world from future threats. This saw the Anti-Monitor being freed from his imprisonment within the Black Lantern Central Power Battery. The Entity's power was later used to defeat Nekron and bring about an end to the Blackest Night, but it disappeared after the battle. Hal Jordan later claimed that he could feel its presence in the world and that it urged him to put the past behind him. Later, a White Lantern Power Battery appeared in the center of a park, and appeared to be in a fight to the death against darkness.

Lights Out
In the aftermath of the defeat of Volthoom, Spectrum users began to experience malfunctions in their ability to use their Power Rings. In addition, the Emotional Embodiments also began to feel weakened and deprived. On a distant world, the Entity came before the weakened Predator and asked "her" to accompany him as they sought out the White Lantern Kyle Rayner. It then travelled to Oa with the Predator, Ophidian and Proselyte to collect Ion. The Entity revealed to the Green Lanterns that all the Embodiments are dying and they must return to the place of their origin.

The place of their origin was eventually revealed to be a reservoir which was inside the Source Wall and where all the primordial energy source of the emotional spectrum was contained. As it turns out, the light manipulated by the various Lanterns, was not infinite in supply, and when the reservoir started to become drained it began affecting all the embodiments. Also, once the reservoir became depleted, the Universe would cease to exist.

References

See also

DC Comics aliens
DC Comics deities
DC Comics extraterrestrial superheroes
Fictional characters with death or rebirth abilities
Fictional characters who can manipulate reality